Pattiam Gopalan was an Indian politician, belonging to the Communist Party of India (Marxist). He was a member of the Kerala State Committee of the party.

He was born on October 6, 1936 in Pattiam, Kannur. Pattiam Gopalan joined the Communist Party of India in 1957. He obtained a Post Graduate degree.

Pattiam Gopalan sided with CPI(M) in the party split, was held in detention for 16 months during 1964-1965. He was elected to the Lok Sabha from the Thalassery constituency in the 1967 Indian general election.

He was elected to the Kerala Legislative Assembly in the 1977 election, representing the Tellicherry constituency.

He died on September 27, 1978.

The Pattiam Gopalan Memorial Club presents a Pattiam Gopalan Memorial Award annually.

External links
News clip on 2016 Pattiam Gopalan Memorial Day celebrations
News clip on 2017 Pattiam Gopalan Memorial Day celebrations

References

Communist Party of India (Marxist) politicians
1936 births
1978 deaths
Kerala MLAs 1977–1979
Lok Sabha members from Kerala
India MPs 1967–1970